The Russian occupation of Tabriz lasted from 30 April 1909 until 28 February 1918, with a brief interruption during 6–31 January 1915. The city of Tabriz was the second city of Qajar Persia at the time, the capital of the region of Azerbaijan, and the traditional residence of the Qajar Crown Prince.

During the Persian Constitutional Revolution, rebellion broke out in Tabriz on 23 June 1908. In early February 1909 government forces under Prince ʿAyn-al-dawla surrounded the city. On 20 April, in response to the siege situation, Britain and Russia agreed that a Russian force should be sent to occupy the city in order "to facilitate the entrance into the town of the necessary provisions, to protect the consulates and foreign subjects, and to help those who so desired to leave the town."

The Russian force under General Snarski occupied Tabriz on 30 April 1909. Negotiations for its withdrawal soon began but dragged on into 1911. On 29 November 1911, the Russian government presented the Persian government with an ultimatum. There were several demands, but most important was to fire the newly employed American lawyer Morgan Shuster. Shuster had been hired by the Majlis (parliament) to organise the country's financial affairs. Upon the Persian parliament's refusal to fire Shuster, the shah dissolved the parliament and agreed to the Russian ultimatum.

The ultimatum nevertheless created unrest in Tabriz. On 21 December, fedayeen attacked the Russian troops, inflicting severe casualties. In response, a brigade of the Russian Imperial Army was dispatched to Tabriz under General Voropanov. Its aim was to occupy three major cities: Tabriz, Anzali and Rasht. The most fierce battle of the Russian invasion occurred in Tabriz, where the constitutionalists resisted. After about three days, the defense of the city's residents broke. The Russians shelled Tabriz with artillery and entered the city on 31 December.

Once in control, the Russians held courts martial to try the fedayeen. The Russians executed the constitutional revolutionaries of Tabriz and their relatives en masse and many civilians of Tabriz as well. The total number of executions is estimated to have been about 1,200. The Seqat-ol-Eslam Tabrizi, a leader of the local Shaykhi sect, was among them. The Russians also destroyed part of the Arg of Tabriz by shelling it. Fire broke out in the Arg while it was held by Russian troops.

During the Russian occupation, Crown Prince Mohammad Hassan Mirza resided in Tabriz. Beginning in 1906 and through a Persian concession, a Russian government company had constructed a road from the Russian railhead at Julfa to Tabriz. While the region under Russian occupation, they upgraded the road to a railroad. It opened to traffic in May 1916 as the first railroad in Persia.

After the Ottoman entry into World War I in November 1914, Ottoman troops advanced into the Caucasus against Russia. This threatened to cut off the troops in Azerbaijan and an evacuation was ordered. Between 17 December 1914 and 6 January 1915, all Russian troops left Tabriz. Many local Christians—Assyrian, Chaldean and Orthodox—left with them. Ottoman Kurds under Aḥmad Mukhtār Bey Shamkhal occupied the city on 8 January.

The Ottoman–Kurdish occupation did not last long. The Ottomans were decisively defeated in the Battle of Sarikamish and the Russians were able to reoccupy the city on 31 January 1915. They remained in control until the Russian Revolution of November 1917 created disorder and confusion among the troops. The evacuation began in early 1918 and on 28 February the last Russian soldiers left Tabriz. On 18 June, the Ottomans began occupying the city.

Gallery

See also
 Tabriz during World War I
 Timeline of Tabriz

References

Invasions by Russia
Russian military occupations
1910s in the Russian Empire
1910s in Iran
Persian Constitutional Revolution
History of Tabriz
Iran–Russia military relations
Invasions of Iran
1911 in Iran
1911 in the Russian Empire
2nd term of the Iranian Majlis
Conflicts in 1911
Mass murder in 1911
Qajar Iran